Concordia Cemetery is a historic cemetery in Buffalo in Erie County, New York. It consists of a  rectangular plot and was founded in 1859 by three German congregations: First Trinity Lutheran Church, St. Peter's Evangelical Church, and St. Stephen's Evangelical Church. It has an important association with the immigrant German community in Buffalo during the late 19th and early 20th centuries. The cemetery includes approximately 21,000 plots.

John McHugh (1844–1910), Indian Campaigns Medal of Honor recipient is buried in Condordia.

It was listed on the National Register of Historic Places in 2008.

Gallery

References

External links
 
 
 "At Concordia, a wealth of history," The Buffalo, News, April 18, 2012

1859 establishments in New York (state)
Cemeteries in Erie County, New York
Cemeteries on the National Register of Historic Places in New York (state)
German-American culture in Buffalo, New York
National Register of Historic Places in Buffalo, New York